Scoparia is a genus of mostly tropical plants including Scoparia dulcis known as licorice weed, sweet broom, vassourinha and many other names.

Species
Species include:
Scoparia aemilii Chodat
Scoparia annua Cham. & Schltdl.
Scoparia dulcis L.
Scoparia elliptica Cham.
Scoparia ericacea Cham. & Schltdl.
Scoparia hassleriana Chodat
Scoparia mexicana R.E. Fr.
Scoparia montevidensis (Spreng.) R.E. Fr.
Scoparia pinnatifida Cham.
Scoparia praedensa (R.E. Fr.) Botta & Cabrera

References

Plantaginaceae
Plantaginaceae genera